Discyphus is a genus of flowering plants from the orchid family, Orchidaceae. It is the only genus in the subtribe Discyphinae of the tribe Cranichideae. It contains only one currently recognized species, Discyphus scopulariae, with two accepted varieties:

Discyphus scopulariae var. longiauriculata Szlach. - Trinidad
Discyphus scopulariae var. scopulariae - Trinidad, Panama, Venezuela, Brazil

References

 Pridgeon, A.M., Cribb, P.J., Chase, M.A. & Rasmussen, F. eds. (2003). Genera Orchidacearum 3. Oxford Univ. Press
 Berg Pana, H. 2005. Handbuch der Orchideen-Namen. Dictionary of Orchid Names. Dizionario dei nomi delle orchidee. Ulmer, Stuttgart

External links
 
 

Orchids of South America
Orchids of Panama
Flora of Trinidad and Tobago
Cranichideae
Monotypic Orchidoideae genera
Cranichideae genera